Disney Channel is a German free-to-air television channel owned by The Walt Disney Company Germany. The channel is based in Munich and for children.

Aimed at all ages, its programming consists of original first-run television series, theatrically released and original made-for-cable movies and select other third-party programming. The original programming is mainly supplied by its U.S. counterpart.

The channel was originally launched on 16 October 1999 as a subscription television channel on the Sky Deutschland platform. However, it was later closed down on 30 November 2013. It was transformed into a free-TV channel on 17 January 2014 replacing Das Vierte.

The network competes with other channels primarily aimed at children such as Super RTL (50% owned by Disney Television until March 2021), KiKa and Nickelodeon Germany.

History 
Walt Disney Television International opened their German offices near Munich on 1 March 1999. Disney Channel Germany was launched on 16 October 1999 as a subscription channel.

Disney purchased Das Vierte (lit. The Fourth), a free-to-air TV station, in December 2012 from Dmitry Lesnevsky, a Russian media mogul, and former owner of Russia's REN-TV. In April 2013, Disney announced that Das Vierte would become Disney Channel in January 2014 as a 24-hour family entertainment network under Disney Channel's German head Lars Wagner.

Initial daytime programming included standard Disney Channel fare including Jessie, Austin & Ally, Phineas and Ferb and Gravity Falls while prime time saw Pixar films and older drawing shows including those from ABC Family as well as Hallmark Channel's Cedar Cove. Disney formed an in house ad sales company, Disney Media +, for the channel given that two competitors control most ad sales companies. The channel will also be offered on two online platforms: live-stream and a catch-up service. The channel launched over the air on 17 January 2014 at 6 AM with the classic animated short film Steamboat Willie. Disney reported that its launch weekend pushed them past Nick in to third place among kid broadcast channels.

Programming

Availability
Via the airwaves, the station had an availability to 93% of German TV households plus on two online platforms: live-stream and a catch-up service.

See also
Super RTL

References

External links
  
 Disney Channel on YouTube
 Disney Channel on Twitter

Germany
Television stations in Germany
Television stations in Austria
Television stations in Switzerland
German-language television stations
Television channels and stations established in 1999
Television channels and stations disestablished in 2013
Television channels and stations established in 2014
Re-established companies
Disney acquisitions
Children's television networks
1999 establishments in Germany